The Gotha Go 146 was a twin-engine utility aircraft developed in Germany in the mid-1930s. It was a conventional low-wing cantilever monoplane with tailwheel undercarriage, the main units of which retracted into the engine nacelles on the wings. It was offered to the Luftwaffe as a high-speed courier aircraft, but the Siebel Fh 104 was selected instead. With Gotha unable to attract other customers, no serious production was undertaken and a small number of prototypes were the only examples built.

Specifications

References
 
 
 

1930s German civil utility aircraft
Go 146
Low-wing aircraft
Aircraft first flown in 1936
Twin piston-engined tractor aircraft